The office of the Surveillance Camera Commissioner is an organization of the government of the United Kingdom. Its role is to encourage compliance with the surveillance camera code of practice. The office of the Surveillance Camera Commissioner works with the Home Office.

The office of the commissioner was created under the Protection of Freedoms Act 2012 to further regulate the use of CCTV in England and Wales. The Act requires a code of practice to be produced about surveillance camera systems. The surveillance camera code of practice sets out new guidelines for CCTV and automatic number-plate recognition.

In March 2021 the government appointed Prof Fraser Sampson to both the Surveillance Camera Commissioner role and also that of the Biometrics Commissioner under the relevant provisions of the Protection of Freedoms Act 2012

Responsibilities
The role of the surveillance camera commissioner is to:

 encourage compliance with the surveillance camera code of practice
 review how the code is working
 provide advice to ministers on whether or not the code needs amending.

The commissioner must produce an annual report for Parliament detailing the commissioner's activities in the 12 months since the previous report.

The commissioner has no enforcement or inspection powers and works with relevant authorities to make them aware of their duty to have regard to the code. The code is not applicable to domestic use in private households. The commissioner also must consider how best to encourage voluntary adoption of the code by other operators of surveillance camera systems.

References

External links
Surveillance Camera Commissioner at Gov.uk

Public bodies and task forces of the United Kingdom government
Video surveillance